Khalil Vossoughi (born 11 March 1938) known professionally as Behrouz Vossoighi (بهروز وثوقی), is an Iranian actor. He has also worked in television, radio and theater. His work has earned him recognition at several international film festivals, including for Best Actor at the International Film Festival of India in 1974 and San Francisco International Film Festival in 2006.

Personal life 
Behrouz was born in Khoy, Iran. He moved to Tehran when he was in his teenage years. He has two brothers: Changiz Vossoughi and Shahrad Vossoughi.

Vossoughi was briefly married in the 1970s, to the Iranian singer Googoosh. He currently lives in Marin County, California with his wife, Katayoun "Katty" Amjadi (also known as Catherine Vossoughi).

Career
He started acting in films with Samuel Khachikian in Toofan dar Shahre Ma and Abbas Shabaviz's Gole gomshodeh (1962), and became a major star as the brooding hero of the revenge drama Qeysar (1969), directed by Masoud Kimiai. Vossoughi received the Best Actor Award at the Sepas Film Festival for this role.

He went on to collaborate with Kimiai on five more films including Dash Akol (1971). His next collaboration with Kimiai was The Deer (1974) in which he played the role of Seyed Rasoul. Vossoughi's most acclaimed performance was as Zar Mohamad, a peasant seeking justice in Tangsir (1973) directed by Amir Naderi. In 1975 Vossoughi appeared in The Beehive in the role of Ebi. In 1978, Vossoughi partnered with Ali Hatami in another film, Sooteh-Delan.
He was one of the first Iranians to appear in American and European co-productions, such as Caravans (1978), co-starring with Anthony Quinn, Jennifer O'Neill and Michael Sarrazin. He also appeared in The Invincible Six (1970) with Curd Jürgens, and Sphinx (1981) with Frank Langella and Lesley-Anne Down.

In 2000, at the San Francisco Film Festival award ceremony, Abbas Kiarostami was awarded the Akira Kurosawa Prize for lifetime achievement in directing, but then gave it to Vossoughi for his contribution to Iranian cinema. In addition to his acting career, in 2012 Vossoughi was an official festival judge for the Noor Iranian Film Festival. He is currently a judge on Persian Talent Show.

Notable films
His most famous film works are Qeysar (1969), The Invincible Six (1970), Reza Motori (1970), Dash Akol (1971), Toughi (1971), Deshne (1972), Baluch (1972), Tangsir (1973), The Deer (1974), Zabih (1975), Mamal Amricayi (1975), Kandoo (1975), Hamsafar (1975), Sooteh-Delan (1978), Caravans (1978) and Sphinx (1981).

Filmography

Film

Television
Falcon Crest (1981) – directed by Reza Badiyi
Nightingales (1989) – directed by Reza Badiyi

Awards and nominations
 Winner Statue Sepas for Best Actor Sepas Film Festival – 1969
 Winner Statue Sepas for Best Actor Sepas Film Festival – 1970
 Nominated Statue Sepas for Best Actor Sepas Film Festival – 1971
 Honorary Diploma for Best Actor Tashkent International Film Forum – 1972
 Best Actor Award International Film Festival of India – 1974
 Winner Winged Goat Award for Best Actor Tehran International Film Festival – 1974
 Nominated Winged Goat Award for Best Actor Tehran International Film Festival – 1975
 Nominated Winged Goat Award for Best Actor Tehran International Film Festival – 1977
 Akira Kurosawa Award San Francisco International Film Festival – 2000
 Lifetime Achievement Award San Francisco International Film Festival – 2006
 Lifetime Achievement Award Thessaloniki International Film Festival – 2012
 Special Achievement Award Tokyo Filmex – 2012
 Winner of people's heart, presented by a heart, from a disabled Iranian-American U.S. Army ex-serviceman from Berkeley, California – January 14, 2017

References

External links

 Official Website
 

Iranian male stage actors
Iranian male film actors
Iranian male television actors
People from Khoy
1938 births
Living people
Actors from San Rafael, California
American people of Iranian-Azerbaijani descent
Iranian emigrants to the United States
Exiles of the Iranian Revolution in the United States
Iranian expatriates in the United States
Iranian Azerbaijanis